SMNI TV 22 of Sonshine Media Network International (DYYQ-TV Channel 22), is a relay station of SMNI TV 43 Davao. It is currently operated from Davao City by Sonshine Media Network International (SMNI) after the network and expand to the entire Philippines. The studios and Transmitter are located in Brgy. Camanjac, Dumaguete, Negros Oriental. The station is currently inactive.

See also
DWBP-TV
Sonshine Media Network International
DXAQ-TV

Television networks in the Philippines
Sonshine Media Network International
Television stations in Negros Oriental
Television channels and stations established in 2005